In the context of Islam, a faajir ( fājir; plural فجرة fajarah) is a "wicked evil-doer", i.e. a "sinner by action". Compare kafir, a "sinner by disbelief in Allah".

The word appears in The Qur'an in Surah Abasa:

References

External links 
"Fajir" in An Enlightening Commentary into the Light of the Holy Qur'an.

Islamic terminology